Shirley Banfield (born 16 October 1937) is an Australian former cricketer.
Banfield played one Test match for the Australia women's national cricket team in 1972.

References

1937 births
Australia women Test cricketers
Living people